Michaela Kargbo (born July 5, 1991) is a track and field sprint athlete who competes internationally for Sierra Leone.

Kargbo represented Sierra Leone at the 2008 Summer Olympics in Beijing. She competed at the 100 metres sprint and placed seventh in her heat without advancing to the second round. She ran the distance in a time of 12.54 seconds.

References

1991 births
Living people
Sierra Leonean female sprinters
Olympic athletes of Sierra Leone
Athletes (track and field) at the 2008 Summer Olympics
Athletes (track and field) at the 2010 Commonwealth Games
Athletes (track and field) at the 2014 Commonwealth Games
Commonwealth Games competitors for Sierra Leone
Olympic female sprinters